Horse Soldier! Horse Soldier! is the fifth studio album by Corb Lund and the Hurtin' Albertans. It was released on Stony Plain Records on November 13, 2007.

Track listing

Chart performance

Certifications

References

External links
[ Horse Soldier! Horse Soldier!] at allmusic

2007 albums
Corb Lund and the Hurtin' Albertans albums
Stony Plain Records albums